Lieutenant-Colonel Sir Arthur Pelham Heneage   (11 July 1881 – 22 November 1971) was a British Conservative Party politician.

In the First World War, Heneage served with the Royal Field Artillery. He was awarded the Distinguished Service Order in the 1917 Birthday Honours,

He was elected as Member of Parliament (MP) for the Louth constituency in Lincolnshire at the 1924 general election, defeating the Liberal Margaret Wintringham, who had been the second woman to take her seat in the House of Commons.

Heneage held the seat until he retired from Parliament at the 1945 general election.

In 1912, Heneage married Anne Findlay, daughter of  Brigadier-General Neil Douglas Findlay, and had five children. He was knighted in the 1945 New Year Honours. He died at his home at Walesby Hall, Market Rasen, Lincolnshire, aged 90.

Labour politician Giles Radice was Heneage's grandson.

References

External links 
 

1881 births
1971 deaths
Conservative Party (UK) MPs for English constituencies
UK MPs 1924–1929
UK MPs 1929–1931
UK MPs 1931–1935
UK MPs 1935–1945
Companions of the Distinguished Service Order
British Army personnel of World War I
Knights Bachelor
Royal Field Artillery officers